The 2001–02 season was the 118th season of competitive association football in Australia.

National teams

Australia national soccer team

Results and fixtures

Friendlies

2002 FIFA World Cup qualification

Intercontinental play-off

Australia women's national soccer team

Results and fixtures

Friendlies

Men's soccer

National Soccer League

Finals series

Women's soccer

Women's National Soccer League

References

2001 in Australian sport
2002 in Australian sport
Seasons in Australian soccer